Yagaria Rural LLG is a local-level government (LLG) of Eastern Highlands Province, Papua New Guinea. The Yagaria language is spoken in the LLG.

Wards
01. Higivavi
02. Oliguti
03. Kami
04. Forapi No. 1
05. Litipinaga
06. Gotomi
07. Lufugu
08. Kiseveroka
09. Kogoraipa
10. Daginava
11. Nupuru

References

Local-level governments of Eastern Highlands Province